The Spring of the Bosna river is a public park featuring the system of numerous springs of the River Bosna at the foothills of Mount Igman in the municipality of Ilidža, on the outskirts of Sarajevo, capital of Bosnia and Herzegovina. Vrelo Bosne is one of the country's popular natural landmarks and provides a quiet escape from city life.

Geography and hydrology

The spring water at Vrelo Bosne is drinkable, however not recommended.

Biodiversity
Typical animals are ducks and swans among others.

History, archaeology and culture
A Roman Bridge is located not far from Vrelo Bosne on the Bosna river in the Ilidža municipality, which was built sometime between 1530 and 1550 from the original Roman stones and ruins of the bridge that stood there during the Roman period used to connect the Romans with the village of Aquae Sulphurae at the time. Ilidža is also known to have been an archaeological site dating 2400–2000BC.

The straight main avenue (Velika Aleja) leading inside contains traditional buildings from the Austro-Hungarian-era offering a peek into the luxuries of the past.

During the Bosnian War the park was not maintained and trees were chopped and used for heating by the local citizens. In 2000 the park was restored to its former look by local youths led by an international ecological organization.

Park entry
On a typical year more than 60,000 tourists visit the park.

The park is usually entered by foot or by horse-carriage via the 3 kilometre avenue (Velika Aleja) leading into it. 

The paths and roads inside the park are ideal for walks and bicycle riding and give the visitors the opportunity to take a closer look at the bubbling streams and waterfalls. Outdoor cafés and restaurants are available offering drinks and food but opening times vary from season to season. 

Adults: 2 KM
Pensioners, students, disabled: 1 KM
Children from 7–16 years old: 1 KM
Children with special needs or up to 7 years old: Entry free

Money from the park entry fees is used to up-keep the park by KJU Zaštićena prirodna područja Kantona Sarajevo.KJU link

Photo gallery

Trivia
Bosnia and Herzegovina national football team is known to hold their training sessions at the Vrelo Bosne park. Team also stays at near by Hotel Hercegovina.

See also
List of rivers of Bosnia and Herzegovina

References

External links

Official Facebook Gallery

SVrelo Bosne
Springs of Bosnia and Herzegovina
Ilidža
Nature parks of Bosnia and Herzegovina
Protected areas of Bosnia and Herzegovina
Tourist attractions in Bosnia and Herzegovina